

304001–304100 

|-bgcolor=#f2f2f2
| colspan=4 align=center | 
|}

304101–304200 

|-bgcolor=#f2f2f2
| colspan=4 align=center | 
|}

304201–304300 

|-id=233
| 304233 Majaess ||  || Daniel Majaess (born 1984) is a young Canadian observational astronomer who researches the Cepheid distance scale, variable stars, and the Milky Way's spiral structure and its many star clusters. || 
|}

304301–304400 

|-id=368
| 304368 Móricz ||  || Zsigmond Móricz (1879–1942), a Hungarian novelist, journalist and one of the most prominent figures of Social Realism in the 20th century. || 
|}

304401–304500 

|-bgcolor=#f2f2f2
| colspan=4 align=center | 
|}

304501–304600 

|-bgcolor=#f2f2f2
| colspan=4 align=center | 
|}

304601–304700 

|-bgcolor=#f2f2f2
| colspan=4 align=center | 
|}

304701–304800 

|-id=788
| 304788 Cresques ||  || Cresques Abraham (1325–1387), a Majorcan Jewish geographer and cartographer. His Catalan Atlas (1375), stored in the Bibliothèque nationale de Paris, is considered one of the pinnacles of medieval cartographic knowledge. || 
|}

304801–304900 

|-id=813
| 304813 Cesarina ||  || Cesarina Papini (born 1964), wife of Italian co-discoverer Michele Mazzucato || 
|}

304901–305000 

|-id=908
| 304908 Steveoda ||  || Steve Oda (born 1946) is a Japanese-Canadian sarod player, composer, and teacher of classical Hindustani music. His virtuosity on the sarod and his kind spirit have enchanted people across the world, and his generosity in teaching has inspired many students to carry on the rich legacy of Classical Indian music. || 
|}

References 

304001-305000